Sam Garrett Lane (born 30 April 1997) is a New Zealand field hockey player.

Personal life
Sam Lane was born in Christchurch, New Zealand and raised in Temuka, New Zealand. He started playing hockey when he was 3 years old.

Career

Club level
In the New Zealand National Hockey League Lane plays for Canterbury.

National team
Sam Lane made his senior debut for the Black Sticks in 2016 during the Trans–Tasman Trophy against Australia.

During his career, Lane has only medalled once with the national side, at the 2017 Oceania Cup held in Sydney, Australia.

Lane's most recent appearance for the national team was during the inaugural tournament of the FIH Pro League. New Zealand finished in eighth and last place.

International Goals

References

External links
 
 
 
 
 

1997 births
Living people
New Zealand male field hockey players
Male field hockey forwards
Field hockey players at the 2020 Summer Olympics
Olympic field hockey players of New Zealand
Field hockey players at the 2022 Commonwealth Games
People from Temuka
Sportspeople from Canterbury, New Zealand
2023 Men's FIH Hockey World Cup players
20th-century New Zealand people
21st-century New Zealand people